Zhongchuan is a town of Huining County, Gansu, China. The town governs over 10 villages and has a population of 15,989. The town is specialized in rapeseed and apricot cultivation.

References 

Township-level divisions of Gansu